The 1993 Copenhagen Open singles was the singles event of the fifth edition of the Copenhagen Open, a tennis tournament held in Copenhagen, Denmark which was part of the ATP World Series and part of the European early indoor court season. Magnus Larsson was the defending champion, but was forced to withdraw before his Semifinal match.

Andrei Olhovskiy won the title by defeating Nicklas Kulti 7–5, 3–6, 6–2 in the final.

Seeds

Draw

Finals

Top half

Bottom half

References

External links
 Official results archive (ATP)
 Official results archive (ITF)

Copenhagen Open
Singles